Cheaper by the Dozen 2 is a 2005 American family comedy film directed by Adam Shankman. It is a sequel to the 2003 film Cheaper by the Dozen and stars Steve Martin, Bonnie Hunt, Tom Welling, Piper Perabo, and Hilary Duff, among other child actors reprising their roles as members of the 12-child Baker family, alongside Eugene Levy and Carmen Electra as new characters. It tells the story of the Baker family as they go on a vacation and contend with a rival family.

The film was released on December 21, 2005 in the United States. It received negative reviews from critics and grossed $135 million worldwide.

Plot

Two years after Tom Baker resigned from his head coaching position, his family begins to undergo many changes, beginning with Lorraine's high school graduation and internship with Allure Magazine in New York City. Nora is now married to Bud McNulty and pregnant with their first child with the intent to move to Houston, Texas because of Bud's new job.

Feeling the family is breaking apart as the children grow up and move away, Tom persuades them to take one last family vacation all together at Lake Winnetka, a fictional lake in Wisconsin. The family finds that their old cabin is currently owned by a man named Mike Romanow. Tom's old rival, Jimmy Murtaugh, his new wife Sarina, and his eight kids Calvin, Anne, Daniel, Becky, Elliot, Lisa, Robin and Kenny are also staying at the lake for the summer; Jimmy is also friends and neighbors with Mike. Jimmy constantly flaunts his wealth and success to Tom, as well as the accomplishments of his children, often suggesting to Tom that his are less successful because of his parenting style. They get into many incidents, several of which are accidental: Mark accidentally sets off a backpack of fireworks, causing widespread panic, especially when it is thrown into a boat, igniting its engine and causing it to explode, he and Kenny crash into a tennis court with a golf cart, and Sarah is caught shoplifting from a gift shop.

Jimmy again brings up the topic that Tom needs to be stricter with his kids. Tom is angered by this, and he and Jimmy decide to settle the matter at the Annual Labor Day Family Cup. Tom trains the kids for days, not realizing they are miserable. Sarah and Elliot go to the movies to see Ice Age, but are spied on by their fathers, which ultimately results in them getting into an altercation and humiliating their children. Upon returning to the Bakers’ cabin, Sarah is furious and refuses to compete for Tom in the Cup. The other children are also angry with him, not only for spying on Sarah, but also for ruining the entire trip because of his competitiveness with the Murtaughs. Kate laments that his and Jimmy’s conflicting parenting styles have torn the two families even further apart.

The next morning, Tom goes to the Cup to compete with Kyle and Nigel, the only two still willing to go. However, after discovering an old "Team Baker" flag, Kate and the rest of the kids show up, forgiving Tom and willing to compete again. After the events, however, the Bakers and the Murtaughs are tied for first; a tiebreaking canoe race is announced, in which every family member must compete. During the canoe race, Nora goes into labor; the Murtaughs want to help, but Jimmy, sensing the opportunity to defeat Tom once and for all, refuses to do so. The Murtaugh children jump out of the canoe to help the Bakers. While arguing with Sarina, Jimmy reveals that he was jealous of Tom being the popular one when they were younger. Eventually, Sarina convinces him to help and the two families work together to get Nora to the hospital. Bud, Lorraine, and Kate go with Nora in the delivery room, while Tom, Jimmy, Sarina, and the rest of the kids stay in the waiting room.

While talking with Jimmy, Tom realizes that he has to let his kids grow, but wherever they go, they will always be together as a family. Nora then gives birth to a baby boy whom she and Bud name after his grandfather, who has shown them that "there is no way to be a perfect parent, but a million ways to be a really good one."

Bud announces that he and Nora have bought the cabin back at the lake. Nora, Bud, and baby Tom leave for Houston a few days later, and the family enjoy the rest of their vacation.

Cast

Bakers
 Steve Martin as Tom Baker, the patriarch of the Baker family and former football coach.
 Bonnie Hunt as Kate Baker, the matriarch of the Baker family and Tom's wife.
 Piper Perabo as Nora Baker-McNulty, Tom & Kate's 1st daughter, Bud's wife, and baby Tom’s mother.
 Tom Welling as Charlie Baker, Tom & Kate's 1st son who becomes a mechanic in order to pay off some college tuition.
 Hilary Duff as Lorraine Baker, Tom & Kate's 2nd daughter who is planning to move to New York so that she can intern at Allure Magazine.
 Kevin G. Schmidt as Henry Baker, Tom & Kate's 2nd son.
 Alyson Stoner as Sarah Baker, Tom & Kate's 3rd daughter.
 Jacob Smith as Jake Baker, Tom & Kate's 3rd son.
 Forrest Landis as Mark Baker, Tom & Kate's 4th son.
 Liliana Mumy as Jessica Baker, Tom & Kate's 4th daughter and Kim's fraternal twin sister.
 Morgan York as Kim Baker, Tom & Kate's 5th daughter and Jessica's fraternal twin sister.
 Blake Woodruff as Mike Baker, Tom & Kate's 5th son.
 Brent Kinsman as Kyle Baker, Tom & Kate's 6th son and Nigel's identical twin brother.
 Shane Kinsman as Nigel Baker, Tom & Kate's 7th son and Kyle's identical twin brother.

Murtaughs
 Eugene Levy as Jimmy Murtaugh, the patriarch of the Murtaugh family who is an old rival of Tom.
 Carmen Electra as Sarina Murtaugh, the matriarch of the Murtaugh family and Jimmy's trophy wife.
 Shawn Roberts as Calvin Murtaugh, Jimmy's 1st son.
 Jaime King as Anne Murtaugh, Jimmy's 1st daughter who becomes Charlie's love interest and conceals a butterfly back tattoo from her father.
 Robbie Amell as Daniel Murtaugh, Jimmy's 2nd son.
 Melanie Tonello as Becky Murtaugh, Jimmy's 2nd daughter.
 Taylor Lautner as Elliot "Eliot" Murtaugh, Jimmy's 3rd son who becomes Sarah's love interest.
 Courtney Fitzpatrick as Lisa Murtaugh, Jimmy's 3rd daughter and Robin's identical twin sister.
 Madison Fitzpatrick as Robin Murtaugh, Jimmy's 4th daughter and Lisa's identical twin sister.
 Alexander Conti as Kenneth "Kenny" Murtaugh, Jimmy's 4th son.

Others
 Jonathan Bennett as Bud McNulty, Nora's husband and Tom & Kate's son-in-law (the father of Tom).
 Peter Keleghan as Mike Romanow, Jimmy’s neighbor and friend who is the owner of the old cabin at Lake Winnetka that the Baker family rents.

The director of the first film, and producer of the sequel, Shawn Levy, has a cameo as a hospital intern. Ben Falcone appears as a theater patron that gets annoyed with Tom and Jimmy's argument.

Soundtrack
 "I Wish" – Stevie Wonder
 "Graduation Day Song" – Joseph L. Altruda
 "Mexicali Mondays" – Christopher Lightbody and Robert Steinmiller
 "What If" – Gina Rene
 "Martini Lounge" – David Sparkman
 "Drinks on the House" – Daniel May
 "Big Sky Lullaby" – Daniel May
 "Someday" – Sugar Ray
 "Express Yourself" – Jason Mraz
 "Michael Finnegan" – Traditional
 "Will the Circle Be Unbroken?" – Traditional
 "Why Can't We Be Friends" – War
 "Die Walküre" – Richard Wagner
 "Wooly Bully" – Sam The Sham & The Pharaohs
 "Mallin" – Tree Adams
 "Under Pressure" – Queen and David Bowie
 "Music from Ice Age" – David Newman
 "Holiday" – Madonna
 "Sunday Morning" (acoustic version) – Maroon 5
 "Bridal Chorus" – Richard Wagner

Reception

Critical response
Review aggregator website Rotten Tomatoes reported that 6% of 93 reviews of the film were positive, with an average rating of 3.9/10. The site's critics consensus reads: "A sequel to a remake, Cheaper 2 wastes its solid cast in scenes of over-the-top, predictable humor." On Metacritic, it has a weighted average score of 34 out of 100 based on 24 critics, indicating "generally unfavorable reviews". Audiences polled by CinemaScore gave the film an average grade of "A–" on an A+ to F scale, the same grade as the first film.

Chicago Sun-Times critic Roger Ebert, gave the film one of its rare positive reviews, awarding it 3 out of 4 stars and stating "As I watched this sequel, a certain good feeling began to make itself known. Yes, the movie is unnecessary. However, it is unnecessary at a higher level of warmth and humor than the recent remake Yours, Mine, and Ours." Ebert also highly praised Alyson Stoner's performance, favorably comparing the then-twelve year old actress to Reese Witherspoon.

Calling the overall film "bland", Variety'''s Justin Chang agreed with Ebert on Stoner, calling her "an endearingly vulnerable standout" and deeming her subplot to be "the most engaging" in it. Chang was also kind to Steve Martin, Bonnie Hunt and Eugene Levy, deeming the veteran actors did the best with what was given to them. Marrit Ingman of the Austin Chronicle conceded that it had a good message, and agreed that Hunt was "marvelous and down-to-earth" but ultimately felt that "the rest of the movie is as funny as mildew", found that "the product placement is particularly egregious" and thought that Hilary Duff looked "as tanned and raw as buffalo jerky". Andrea Gronvall was also horrified by Duff's appearance while writing for the Chicago Reader, calling her "haggard" and "flat-out scary", and overall felt that there was "a discernible lack of enthusiasm from almost everyone involved", however singling out Carmen Electra for being "the most winning performer of the bunch".

The film received two Razzie Award nominations including Worst Actress (Hilary Duff) and Worst Supporting Actor (Eugene Levy).

Box office
The film grossed $9,309,387 on its opening weekend, finishing in 4th place at the box office behind King Kong, The Chronicles of Narnia: The Lion, the Witch and the Wardrobe, and Fun with Dick and Jane. By the end of its run, Cheaper by the Dozen 2 grossed $82,571,173 domestically and $46,610,657 internationally, totaling $129,181,830 worldwide. It is one of only twelve feature films to be released in over 3,000 theaters and still improve on its box office performance in its second weekend, increasing 55.6% from $9,309,387 to $14,486,519.

Home video
The DVD was released on May 23, 2006. The Blu-ray was released on January 5, 2010. The DVD is two-sided and side B features previews of Flicka and Aquamarine''.
Other DVD extras include an audio commentary with director Adam Shankman, behind-the-scenes featurettes, and theatrical trailers.

References

External links

 
 

2005 films
2005 comedy films
2000s pregnancy films
American children's comedy films
American pregnancy films
American sequel films
2000s English-language films
Films about families
Films about siblings
Films about vacationing
Films shot in Hamilton, Ontario
Films shot in Toronto
20th Century Fox films
21 Laps Entertainment films
Films directed by Adam Shankman
Films scored by John Debney
2000s American films